Kut is a Turkish surname. Notable people with the surname include:

 Burak Kut (born 1973), Turkish pop singer and songwriter
 Halil Kut (1881–1957), Ottoman regional governor and military commander
 Şule Kut, Turkish academic

Turkish-language surnames